These are the official results of the Women's Heptathlon competition at the 1999 World Championships in Seville, Spain. 22 athletes participated, and that includes four non-finishers. The competition started on Saturday 21 August 1999 and ended on Sunday 22 August 1999.

Medalists

Schedule

Saturday, August 21

Sunday, August 22

Records

Results

See also
 1999 Hypo-Meeting

References
 
 trackandfieldnews

D
Heptathlon at the World Athletics Championships
1999 in women's athletics